Waldron is a village in the Canadian province of Saskatchewan within the Rural Municipality of Grayson No. 184 and Census Division No. 5.

History 
Waldron incorporated as a village on July 17, 1909.

Demographics 

References 

Villages in Saskatchewan
Grayson No. 184, Saskatchewan
Division No. 5, Saskatchewan